Yining County as the official romanized name, also transliterated from Uyghur as Gulja County, is a county within the Ili Kazakh Autonomous Prefecture of the Xinjiang Uyghur Autonomous Region of China. The county seat is in the town of Jélilyüzi.

Yining County does not include the adjacent city of Yining, which is a county-level administrative unit in its own right.

The county land area is 4486 km², with the population of 360,000 people as of 2004.

Administrative divisions  

ئىزاھات:
1. 2015-يىلى 7-ئاينىڭ 24-كۈنى شىنجاڭ ئۇيغۇر ئاپتونوم رايونلۇق خەلق ھۆكۈمىتىنىڭ تەستىقلىشى بىلەن ئەسلىدىكى خۇدىياريۈزى يېزىسى خۇدىياريۈزى بازىرى قىلىپ ئۆزگەرتىلگەن. 
2. 2016-يىلى 11-ئاينىڭ 20-كۈنى شىنجاڭ ئۇيغۇر ئاپتونوم رايونلۇق خەلق ھۆكۈمىتىنىڭ تەستىقلىشى بىلەن ئەسلىدىكى ئارائۆستەڭ يېزىسى ئارائۆستەڭ بازىرى قىلىپ ئۆزگەرتىلگەن. 
3. 2014-يىلى 10-ئاينىڭ 21-كۈنى شىنجاڭ ئۇيغۇر ئاپتونوم رايونلۇق خەلق ھۆكۈمىتىنىڭ تەستىقلىشى بىلەن ئەسلىدىكى يېڭىتام يېزىسى يېڭىتام بازىرى قىلىپ ئۆزگەرتىلگەن. 
4. 2016-يىلى 1-ئاينىڭ 9-كۈنى شىنجاڭ ئۇيغۇر ئاپتونوم رايونلۇق خەلق ھۆكۈمىتىنىڭ تەستىقلىشى بىلەن ئەسلىدىكى بايتوقاي يېزىسى بايتوقاي بازىرى قىلىپ ئۆزگەرتىلگەن.

غۇلجا ناھىيىسى قارمىقىدا 12 دانە يېزا بار بولۇپ، ئۇلار تۆۋەندىكىچە:

Climate

History
The territories were inhabited by turkik tribes from early history. The name Kuldga was first mentioned at the period of Turkik Khanate. When the Uyghur tribes, led by Pen Tekin, left to the west, part of the Yaglakar tribe, which was part of the Uyghur tribal union, left with them.

Chagatai Khan, the son of Genghis Khan, placed the capital of his possessions here. These lands were ruled by the Dzungar until they were conquered in the middle of the 18th century by the Qing during the so-called third Oirat-Manchu war. For a long time, Gulja was the de facto administrative and military capital of Qing Xinjiang (literally “New Frontiers”). 
The county was created in 1888 and was originally known as Ningyuan County. It received its present name in 1914.

In 1952, the city of Yining was separated from Yining County into a separate county-level administrative unit.

References

External links
 County Government 

County-level divisions of Xinjiang
1888 establishments in China
Ili Kazakh Autonomous Prefecture
Yining County